City In Love (1996) is a collection of short stories by the American novelist Alex Shakar.  The stories are set in a mythical version of New York City.  The year is said to be 1 B.C., but the atmosphere is more or less contemporary.   The stories are based on the Metamorphoses myths of Ovid.  As in the Metamorphoses, some of the transformations of City In Love are physical and fantastical, while others are psychological or metaphorical.  The stories range in form from traditional to experimental, though all are character- and narrative-based.  Originally released by FC2 as winner of the National Fiction Competition in 1996, it was rereleased by HarperCollins in 2002.

Story summaries

•	“The Sky Inside,” told from multiple points of view, tells the story of Howard Menski, a Museum of Natural History security guard, and his clandestine exploits around the city.  Significant motifs include astrology, santería, performance art, and astronomy.

•	“A Million Years from Now” follows a junk sculptor as he builds his ideal woman from found materials.

•	“Waxman’s Sun” is about a boy who seeks out his estranged father, a subway conductor, and takes control of a special train on a surreal adventure.

•	“Maximum Carnage” is told by an abused Queens schoolgirl who invents a superhero in a classroom project.  Themes include sexual abuse, and violence in popular culture.

•	“On Morpheus, Relating to Orpheus…,” told by Orpheus, a young artist.  He relates the history of his parents, Morpheus and Rochelle, their elopement and early days in New York; Morpheus’ struggles with addiction, and his greatest performance, for an audience of one.  Themes include addiction, ambition, and artistry.

•	“A Change of Heart” tells the stories of Carl Cadwallater, a newly minted millionaire, and Laura Lambert, a green-haired slacker.  They meet in a bar called the Babybar, get drugged by a diaper-wearing bartender, and Carl chases Laura through a hallucinogenic night of clubhopping.

•	“City In Love,” follows a solipsistic ad copywriter, and his struggles to wake up to the love offered by a woman he works with.  The story is the most structurally experimental of the collection, containing a prototypical form of hypertext—highlighted words with subtextual indicators leading forward or backward to pages containing the same highlighted word.  When the reader gets close to the end of the story, a footnote explains how the words can be followed, reading the text between highlighted words and jumping each time a new one is reached, which reveals an embedded secret story within the story, and with it, the protagonist’s fate.

Correspondences with myths

Certain of the stories reference more than one myth.  But the primary correspondences are as follows :

•	“The Sky Inside” – Hercules series

•	“A Million Years from Now” – Pygmalion

•	“Waxman’s Sun” – Phaëton

•	“Maximum Carnage” – Caenis/Caeneus

•	“On Morpheus, Relating to Orpheus…,” – Ceyx and Alcyone

•	“A Change of Heart” – Apollo and Daphne

	“City In Love” – Narcissus and Echo

References

1.	Alex Shakar, City In Love, frontmatter.

2.	Alex Shakar, City In Love (HarperPerennial reprint), p. 165

Release details

•	1996, USA, FC2,  (hardcover)

•	1997, USA, FC2,  (paperpack)

•	2002, USA, HarperCollins Perennial,  (paperback)

External links
City In Love page on author's Website

1996 short story collections
American short story collections
Novels set in New York City
FC2 books